The Iglesia Parroquial de Santa María del Rosario is located some 20 km of Havana, Cuba, in the municipality of Cotorro.

History 
It was built between 1760 and 1766 and is known by the title given by the  Obispo Espada: “The Cathedral of the fields of Cuba”. It has been declared in two occasions (1946 and 1984) a National Monument. It has a baroque altar of amazing beauty, only comparable with the altar of the Church of Remedios. The gigantic altar still contains its Solomonic column covered in gold.

Famous Visitors 
The first Cuban scientist graduated in medicine, the Dr. Tomás Romay and Chacón, was baptised in the Iglesia Parroquial de Santa María del Rosario in 1764. The Cuban writer Alejo Carpentier married  in this church by the decade of 1940.

José María Chacón and Calvo, famous hispanist and sixth earl of House Bayona was baptised in this church. The church was visited by Queen Sofia of Spain in 1999.

References 

Roman Catholic churches in Cuba